Dzietrzniki  is a village in the administrative district of Gmina Pątnów, within Wieluń County, Łódź Voivodeship, in central Poland.

The village has a population of 1,064.

References

Dzietrzniki